Pacific Resident Theatre (PRT) is a 501(c)(3) non-profit theatre company located at 703 Venice Boulevard in Venice, California.  It was founded as an actors cooperative in Venice's arts district in 1985 and is dedicated to producing both classic and little known plays, as well as works by new authors.  The company has received over 90 awards including awards from the L.A. Drama Critics Circle, Drama-Logue, the NAACP, the LA Weekly and Garland.

References

External links
 Official website

Theatre companies in Los Angeles
Arts organizations established in 1985
1985 establishments in California